Alice Wegmann Corrêa (born 3 November 1995) is a Brazilian actress.

Filmography

Television

Film

Stage

Awards and nominations

References

External links 

 
 

1995 births
Living people
Actresses from Rio de Janeiro (city)
Brazilian people of German descent
Brazilian television actresses
Brazilian telenovela actresses
Brazilian film actresses
Brazilian stage actresses